 

The CorA transport system is the primary Mg2+ influx system of Salmonella typhimurium and Escherichia coli. CorA is ubiquitous in the Bacteria and Archaea. There are also eukaryotic members of the family localized to the mitochondrial membrane such as MRS2 and Lpe10 in yeast.

Subfamilies
Magnesium and cobalt transport protein CorA

Human proteins containing this domain 
MRS2L;

References

Further reading
 
 
 

Protein domains
Protein families
Transmembrane transporters